Idol stjörnuleit (English: Idol Starsearch) is Iceland's version of the British reality series Pop Idol.  The show allows the people of Iceland—through telephone voting—to select the winner of several televised singing contests, following the same format as Pop Idol. Iceland is the smallest country (by population) to have its own Idol show.

The show airs on Stöð 2, four seasons have aired. Winners were Kalli Bjarni, Hildur Vala, Snorri Snorrason and Hrafna Hanna Elísa Herbertsdóttir. It is hosted by Jói and Simmi.

Judges
The judges of Idol - Stjörnuleit seasons 1 and 2 were:
 Bubbi Morthens, musician and legend
 Sigríður Beinteinsdóttir, singer and musician 
 Þorvaldur Bjarni Þorvaldsson, No. 1 music producer in Iceland and guitarist for rock band Todmobile

For season 3, Þorvaldur decided to leave and was replaced by 2 new judges making a total of four.
 Páll Óskar, musician and singer
 Einar Bárðarson, entrepreneur, artist manager and songwriter

After more than three years absent from Icelandic Television, Idol stjörnuleit returned for its fourth season in early 2009 with Jói and Simmi returning as hosts but with a complete new panel of judges consisting of:
 Björn Jörundur Friðbjörnsson, musician and actor
 Selma Björnsdóttir, musician/singer and dancer, two times representative of Iceland in the Eurovision Song Contest
 Jón Ólafsson, musician

Season one

The inaugural season of Idol stjörnuleit aired in 2003–2004.

Semi Final Qualifications
Top 32
Format: 2 out of 8 making the final each week + one Wildcard

Season two

The second season of Idol stjörnuleit aired in 2004–2005.

Semi Final Qualifications
Top 32
Format: 2 out of 8 making the final each week + 2 Wildcards

Finals Elimination Chart

Season three

The third season of Idol stjörnuleit aired in 2005–2006.

Season four

After three successive Idol stjörnuleit series in 2003-2004, 2004-2005 and 2005-2006, the program went on a hiatus to return for a fourth season in 2009.  

 
Television series by Fremantle (company)
2003 Icelandic television series debuts
2009 Icelandic television series endings
2000s Icelandic television series
Non-British television series based on British television series
Stöð 2 original programming